The Hildur-class monitors consisted of seven monitors built for the Swedish Navy in the 1870s. They were sold in 1919 and most were converted into fuel oil barges. One such ship, has been converted into a museum ship.

Design and description
The Hildur-class monitors were designed by Lieutenant John Christian d'Ailly, from a proposal by John Ericsson, for the defense of Lake Mälaren and the Stockholm archipelago. The crew of the first two monitors, Hildur and Gerda, numbered 42 officers and men, the others had 48-man crews. Hildur and Gerda only had a stern rudder, the other had rudders at bow and stern. Bow rudders were fitted to the older ships when they were reconstructed.

The Hildurs had a pair of two-cylinder horizontal-return connecting-rod steam engines, each driving a single propeller using steam from two cylindrical boilers. The ships carried  of coal.

The monitors were equipped with one  M/69 rifled breech loader, mounted in a long, fixed, oval-shaped gun turret. The gun and its turret in Folke were oriented to the rear. Hildur and Gerda were rearmed with a  quick-firing gun as well as three  quick-firing guns 1890; the other were similarly rearmed later in the 1890s or the early 1900s.

Bjorn and Ulf had a  belt while Folkes belt ranged from  forward to 76 mm aft.

Construction

Service
During Hildurs gunnery trials in 1872, her shells penetrated the walls of Vaxholm Fortress in three shots.

See also 
 List of ironclads

References

Bibliography